Daniel Hanley (born 7 April 1974) is an English football goalkeeper.

Career

Hanley had spells with junior sides Larkhall Thistle, Vale of Clyde and Pollok, before stepping up to the senior game with Clyde in August 2000. Hanley was backup to #1 keeper Bryn Halliwell, and only made 4 appearances for Clyde, before leaving in May 2001, joining Pollok for a second spell. Had a successful spell at underwear modelling when leaving the game with Calvin Klein. Winner of the Leicestershire Vets top league in 2021/22 alongside Vets cup Winner Boo.

External links

1974 births
Living people
English footballers
Clyde F.C. players
Scottish Football League players
Larkhall Thistle F.C. players
Pollok F.C. players
Association football goalkeepers